Jacob Harry Maguire (born 5 March 1993) is an English professional footballer who plays as a centre-back for  club Manchester United and the England national team. He is known as a strong and authoritative defender.

Maguire came through the youth system at Sheffield United before graduating to the first team in 2011. He totalled 166 professional games for the club and was their Player of the Year three consecutive times, also featuring in the PFA Team of the Year for League One as many times. In 2014, he transferred to Hull City for £2.5 million, who loaned him to Wigan Athletic in 2015. He joined Leicester City in 2017 for an initial fee of £12 million and in the 2017–18 season he played in every minute and was awarded player of the season, as well as the players' player of the season at the club's end of season awards. Later, he moved to Manchester United for a fee believed to be £80 million, a world-record amount for a defender, and within six months was appointed the club captain.

Maguire played one match for England under-21 in 2012. In October 2017, he made his senior debut and he was chosen for the England's squads for the 2018 FIFA World Cup, 2022 FIFA World Cup and UEFA Euro 2020, earning a place in the Team of the Tournament in the latter.

Early life
Maguire was born in Sheffield, South Yorkshire and was raised in the nearby village of Mosborough. His brothers, Joe and Laurence, are also footballers. He attended Immaculate Conception Catholic Primary School in Spinkhill and St Mary's Roman Catholic High School in Chesterfield. From 7 to 16 years old, Maguire played as central midfielder for Sheffield United's academy.

Club career

Sheffield United

2011–2012: Debut and regular appearances
After coming through the youth system at Sheffield United, and with the team struggling against relegation, Maguire was promoted to the first-team squad, making his debut after coming on as a half-time substitute and winning the man of the match award in a home match against Cardiff City in April 2011. He made four further appearances that season but could not prevent the club from being relegated to League One.

Having cemented his place in the first team Maguire scored his first goal for the Blades in a 2–0 win at Oldham Athletic on the opening day of the 2011–12 League One season. Having been ever present from the start of the season Maguire was handed an extended deal in October to keep him at Bramall Lane until 2015. He continued in great form as the Blades pushed for promotion from League One and was rewarded at the end of the season when he was named as both "Player of the Year" and "Young Player of the Year" by the club. The BBC's Match of the Day magazine selected Maguire in its League One Team of The Year for 2011–12.

2012–2014: Continued success
Maguire went into the following season as first choice in the centre of defence and his good form continued as he scored a brace in a Football League Trophy tie in a 4–1 victory over Notts County at Meadow Lane on 17 October 2012. By the end of February 2013 Maguire had made his 100th start for the Blades in a 0–0 draw against Leyton Orient at Bramall Lane at the age of just 19.

On 21 June 2014, it was revealed that United had offered Maguire an improved contract amid interest from Hull City and Wolverhampton Wanderers in signing Maguire with United already rejecting a £1 million and an improved £1.5 million bid from Wolves.

Hull City

2014–2015: Debut and first appearances
On 29 July 2014, Maguire joined Hull City in a deal worth £2.5 million, signing a three-year contract. He made his debut for the Tigers on 21 August in the UEFA Europa League play-off round first leg away to Lokeren of Belgium, a 1–0 defeat. He did not make his Premier League debut until 20 December, when he replaced the injured Curtis Davies for the final 13 minutes of a home loss by the same score against Swansea City.

2015–2016: Loan to Wigan Athletic
After making only six appearances across all competitions at Hull, Maguire joined Wigan Athletic of the Championship on a one-month loan deal on 10 February 2015. A week later, he debuted in a 1–0 win at Reading. On 28 February, he scored a header from Jermaine Pennant's cross in a 3–1 win away to Blackpool. Having played as many games in his month-long loan as he had for Hull in the first half of the season, Maguire's stay at the DW Stadium was extended until the end of the season.

2016–2017: First team regular and impressive performances
While Maguire was out on loan, Hull had been relegated to the Championship. On 28 May 2016, they won promotion back with a 1–0 play-off final win over Sheffield Wednesday at Wembley Stadium, with him replacing goalscorer Mohamed Diamé in the final minute.

In 2016–17, manager Mike Phelan made Maguire into a first-team regular. Maguire scored his first goal for Hull in a 2–1 EFL Cup win against Bristol City on 25 October 2016. Maguire captained Hull in their league victory against Middlesbrough on 5 April 2017 and scored his first Premier League goal in the 4–2 win. In a season that ended with relegation, he was voted Hull's Player of the Year by both the fans and the players.

Leicester City

2017–2019: Successful performances
On 15 June 2017, Maguire signed for Premier League club Leicester City on a five-year contract for an initial £12 million fee, potentially rising to £17 million with add-ons. He made his debut on 11 August as the season began with a 4–3 loss at Arsenal, and eight days later he scored his first goal for the Foxes, heading in Riyad Mahrez's corner to conclude a 2–0 win over Brighton & Hove Albion at the King Power Stadium. He played in every minute of the 2017–18 season and was awarded player of the season, as well as players' player of the season at the club's end of season awards.

Amid speculation about a transfer to Manchester United for a potential world-record fee for a defender, Maguire's Leicester manager Claude Puel confirmed on transfer deadline day of 9 August 2018 that Maguire would stay at the club, his only travel to Manchester being to face United with the Leicester squad in the fixture the evening after.

Manchester United

2019–2020: Most expensive defender and club captain 
In July 2019, Manchester United made a £70 million bid for Maguire, a year after the club backed down from a deal because the same fee was considered too high. They made an improved bid, believed to be £80 million, which was accepted by Leicester on 2 August. The fee surpassed the £75 million Liverpool paid for Virgil van Dijk in January 2018, making Maguire the world's most expensive defender. The transfer was completed on 5 August, with Maguire signing a six-year contract with the option of a further year. He made his United debut in their opening match of the Premier League season, a 4–0 home victory over Chelsea on 11 August, and received the Man of the Match award.

On 17 January 2020, he was named as the new club captain by manager Ole Gunnar Solskjær following Ashley Young's departure to Inter Milan. Nine days later, he opened up a 6–0 FA Cup win against Tranmere Rovers by scoring his first goal for United. He scored his first Premier League goal for United on 17 February against Chelsea in a 2–0 away win. On 27 June, after the 3-month delay caused by the COVID-19 pandemic, United's FA Cup run resumed with a quarter-final tie against Norwich City which finished 2–1, Maguire scoring the winning goal deep into extra time. Maguire played a significant part in United's successful 2019–20 Premier League campaign, which saw them finish in third place, their second-highest league finish since the retirement of Sir Alex Ferguson. Maguire played in every minute of United's 38 game league campaign, becoming the first outfield player to do so for the club since 1995.

2020–2021: Prolific performances

On 17 October 2020, Maguire scored his first goal of the season, equalising in the 23rd minute in a league match against Newcastle United that eventually ended in a 4–1 away win. On 27 January 2021, he equalised in the 64th minute even though the match ended in a 2–1 home loss against his former club Sheffield United, which ended a 13-match unbeaten run since the team lost to Arsenal on 1 November 2020. When several teammates received racist threats following the loss, Maguire joined other past and present United players condemning the abuse. He played the full 90 minutes on 2 February in United's Premier League record-equalling 9–0 home win against Southampton.

On 25 April, he equalled Gary Pallister's club record for playing the most number of league games without being substituted, by playing the full 90 minutes for the 71st consecutive Premier League game, in a scoreless draw against Leeds United. However, he couldn't break the record, as he had to be substituted in the 72nd minute of the subsequent game on 9 May, a 3–1 home win over Aston Villa, owing to an ankle injury. On 26 May, Maguire missed the 2021 UEFA Europa League Final against Villarreal due to injury, in which United lost on penalties after a 1–1 draw.

2021–2022: Lack of consistency

 

Despite winning approximately twice as many duels as he lost in the 2020-2021 season, Maguire admitted enduring a "tough" time in which Manchester United finished sixth with their lowest points tally since the formation of the Premier League. Maguire also came under intense criticism for his performances as many believed he had failed to show consistency.

International career

Youth

2012–2014: Under 21s
Maguire qualified to play for England, as well as Northern Ireland and the Republic of Ireland through his grandparents  However, he was called up to the England national under-21 team for the first time in November 2012 for a friendly against Northern Ireland. Danny Wilson stated "He has got a fantastic maturity for his age, he takes everything in his stride and nothing fazes him. I don't expect this call-up to either because he is such a level headed character." Maguire duly made his England under-21 debut as a substitute in the 60th minute, coming on for Liverpool's Andre Wisdom in a 2–0 win against Northern Ireland Under-21s at Bloomfield Road.

Senior

2017: 2018 FIFA World Cup qualification
On 24 August 2017, England manager Gareth Southgate included Maguire in his squad for the 2018 FIFA World Cup qualification matches against Malta and Slovakia. He made his debut when starting in England's 1–0 away win over Lithuania, which was the team's final match in their successful World Cup qualification campaign.

2018: 2018 FIFA World Cup
Maguire was named in the 23-man England squad for the 2018 FIFA World Cup. He assisted Harry Kane's winner against Tunisia on 18 June 2018 in England's World Cup opener. England won 2–1. Maguire scored his first England goal on 7 July with a 30th-minute header from Ashley Young's cross in a 2–0 win over Sweden in the quarter-finals.

2019–20: UEFA Euro 2020
At Euro 2020, he played his first match against Czech Republic in the last fixture of the group stage. Afterwards, he featured in the round of 16, when England won 2–0 against Germany, for which he was awarded the Star of the Match. On 3 July 2021, Maguire scored the second goal for England in a 4–0 win over Ukraine in the quarter-finals. Maguire started in the semi-finals against Denmark and in the final against Italy. England drew 1–1 after 120 minutes; in the resulting penalty shoot-out Maguire scored England's second penalty, which is often considered to be the best penalty of the year 2021. However, England would go on to lose 3–2. His performances during the tournament earned him a place in the UEFA Euro 2020 Team of the Tournament.

2021–22: 2022 FIFA World Cup qualification
On 15 November 2021, Maguire scored the opening goal in a 10–0 victory over San Marino on the final day of 2022 FIFA World Cup qualification, making him England's highest scoring defender with seven goals, surpassing John Terry and Jack Charlton.

2022: 2022 FIFA World Cup
Maguire was selected for England’s 26-man squad for the 2022 FIFA World Cup in Qatar where he earned praise for a controlling performance in a 0-0 draw against the United States – a game in which he made his 50th appearance for England – as well as for consistent and successful performances in the latter stages of the tournament. Maguire was thus selected for the 2022 FIFA World Cup Team of the Tournament.

Style of play

Maguire is known for his composure on the ball as well as his physical strength and presence. Maguire is also a powerful and accomplished penalty-kick taker and is notable for his ability to score powerful headers.

Personal life
In February 2018, Maguire got engaged to his long-term girlfriend Fern Hawkins after seven years of dating. The couple married on 25 June 2022 at the Chateau de Varennes in South Burgundy, France. On 3 April 2019, Maguire revealed on his Instagram page that Hawkins had given birth to their first child, a daughter. Maguire and Hawkins had their second daughter on 9 May 2020.

Altercation in Greece
On 21 August 2020, Maguire was arrested on the Greek island of Mykonos after an incident involving the police. Manchester United said in a statement that Maguire was "fully co-operating with the Greek authorities." Maguire appeared in court on the island of Syros the following day, after spending two days in detention. He was released from custody with his trial postponed until 25 August. On 25 August, Maguire was convicted of all charges, and found guilty of aggravated assault, resisting arrest and attempted bribery by a court on the island of Syros. Maguire was absent at the court ruling. The same day, Maguire was given a suspended jail term of 21 months and 10 days as it was a first offence and the three charges were classed as misdemeanours.

On 26 August 2020, Maguire's legal team lodged an appeal against the court verdict. While Manchester United and some British media sources have asserted that his conviction is nullified, this is disputed by the prosecution. On 5 March 2021, it was reported that Maguire's appeal was unlikely to take place in 2021, and that while the prosecution are keen for the case to be resolved as quickly as possible, proceedings could theoretically be delayed until 2028.

Bomb threat
In 2022, Maguire was targeted with a bomb threat, resulting in the police sweeping his house for devices.

Career statistics

Club

International

England score listed first, score column indicates score after each Maguire goal

Honours
Hull City
Football League Championship play-offs: 2016

Manchester United
EFL Cup: 2022–23
UEFA Europa League runner-up: 2020–21

England
UEFA European Championship runner-up: 2020
UEFA Nations League third place: 2018–19

Individual
PFA Team of the Year: 2011–12 League One, 2012–13 League One, 2013–14 League One
Football League One Team of the Season: 2013–14
Football League Young Player of the Month: August 2011
Sheffield United Player of the Year: 2011–12, 2012–13, 2013–14
Sheffield United Young Player of the Year: 2011–12
Hull City Fans' Player of the Year: 2016–17
Hull City Players' Player of the Year: 2016–17
Leicester City Player of the Season: 2017–18
Leicester City Players' Player of the Season: 2017–18
UEFA Europa League Squad of the Season: 2020–21
UEFA European Championship Team of the Tournament: 2020

References

External links

Profile at the Manchester United F.C. website
Profile at the Football Association website

1993 births
Living people
Footballers from Sheffield
People from Mosborough
English footballers
Association football defenders
Sheffield United F.C. players
Hull City A.F.C. players
Wigan Athletic F.C. players
Leicester City F.C. players
Manchester United F.C. players
English Football League players
Premier League players
England under-21 international footballers
England international footballers
2018 FIFA World Cup players
UEFA Euro 2020 players
2022 FIFA World Cup players
English people of Irish descent
Victims of bomb threats